Ceilhes-et-Rocozels is a commune in the Hérault department in southern France.

Politics
In March 1995, a nonparty left-wing mayor was elected, Ahmed Abdelkader. He was re-elected in March 2001, but was removed from office in December 2005 after a judicial condemnation. Jacques Cambon, the grandson of a former mayor was appointed interim mayor and elected as the permanent mayor in March 2008.

Population

See also
Communes of the Hérault department

References

Communes of Hérault